Bunbury Catholic College is a Catholic secondary school, located in Bunbury, in the South West region of Western Australia.

The college was formed in 1973 after the amalgamation of St Francis Xavier's College (operated by the Marist Brothers) and St Joseph's College (operated by the Sisters of Mercy) and provides a general and religious education for approximately 1,000 students from Year 7 to Year 12.

History

In 1973 the Bishop of Bunbury mandated the administration of systemic Bunbury Catholic College to the Catholic Education Commission. The college developed from the amalgamation of St Francis Xavier College (Marist Brothers) and St Joseph's School (Mercy Sisters). The Commission fosters the continuous development and improvement of Catholic schools, acts on behalf of the Catholic community and determines major policy.

In 2015, a second campus was built in the nearby suburb of Australind; commonly known as the Mercy campus. The campus name is derived from the Sisters of Mercy, who co-founded the school. The Mercy Campus became independent in 2020, and split to form Our Lady of Mercy College.

Notable alumni

 Natalie BarrSeven Network presenter
 John Castrillipolitician
 Alexandra HaganOlympian
 Abbe Maymusician
 Anthony MorabitoAustralian rules football player
 Lauren ReynoldsOlympian
 Josh Risdonsoccer player
Wilson Tucker – politician

See also

 List of schools in rural Western Australia
 Catholic education in Australia

References

External links 
 Bunbury Catholic College website

Catholic secondary schools in Western Australia
Association of Marist Schools of Australia
Sisters of Mercy schools
Educational institutions established in 1973
1973 establishments in Australia
Education in Bunbury, Western Australia
Roman Catholic Diocese of Bunbury